Psychedelic Press is an independent publisher and media organisation launched in 2008 as a website devoted to reviews of literature focused on entheogens and psychedelic substances. The website has since expanded to an online magazine format, consisting of interviews, news and articles encompassing psychedelic culture, literature, history and science of psychoactive plants and compounds.

The journal has published contributions from authors such as DMT researcher Rick Strassman, Stanislav Grof, the co-founder of transpersonal psychology, LSD historian Andy Roberts and Mike Jay. The publisher also works with independent artists including some of Britain’s leading visionary artists like Stuart Griggs to produce the cover art for publications.

Books 

 Science Revealed (2014) by Reverend Nemu
 Erin (2015) by Robert Dickins
 To Fathom Hell or Soar Angelic (2015) by Ben Sessa
 Noumenautics (2015) by Peter Sjöstedt-H
 Acid Drops (2016) by Andy Roberts
 Modes of Sentience (2021) by Peter Sjöstedt-Hughes

References

External links 
 Psychedelic Press
 Psychedelic Press Literature Review

Psychedelic literature